Preachers Run is a stream in the U.S. state of South Dakota.

Preachers Run was named in memory of a pioneer preacher who disappeared near this creek.

See also
List of rivers of South Dakota

References

Rivers of Edmunds County, South Dakota
Rivers of Faulk County, South Dakota
Rivers of South Dakota